Megachile alticola is a species of bee in the family Megachilidae. It was described by Cameron in 1902.

References

alticola
Insects described in 1902